Mad Max: Fury Road is a 2015 post-apocalyptic action film directed by George Miller. It was produced by Miller, Doug Mitchell, and PJ Voeten. The screenplay was written by Miller, Brendan McCarthy, and Nico Lathouris. The film is set in a dystopian desert wasteland where gasoline and water are rare commodities. Tom Hardy stars as the title character Max Rockatansky, who helps rebel soldier Imperator Furiosa (Charlize Theron), rescue five women from the imprisonment of despotic leader Immortan Joe (Hugh Keays-Byrne). Nicholas Hoult and Rosie Huntington-Whiteley feature in supporting roles. It is the fourth film in the Mad Max franchise.

The film premiered at the TCL Chinese Theatre in Los Angeles on 7 May 2015. Warner Bros. later gave the film a wide release on 15 May at over 3,700 theaters in the United States and Canada. Mad Max: Fury Road grossed a worldwide total of over $375 million on a production budget of $154.6–185.1 million. Rotten Tomatoes, a review aggregator, surveyed 424 reviews and judged 97 percent to be positive. Mad Max: Fury Road garnered many awards and nominations in a variety of categories with particular praise for Miller's direction, screenplay, action sequences, visuals, costume design, cinematography, musical score, editing, and the performances of Hardy and Theron.

Mad Max: Fury Road received ten nominations at the 88th Academy Awards, including Best Picture, Best Director for Miller, and Best Visual Effects. It went on to win the most awards at the ceremony, with six, including Best Film Editing, Best Production Design, and Best Costume Design. Mad Max: Fury Road garnered seven nominations at the 69th British Academy Film Awards, and won four for Best Production Design, Best Editing, Best Makeup & Hair, and Best Costume Design. At the 5th AACTA Awards, the film received fifteen nominations, and won ten including Best Film, and Best Direction for Miller. Mad Max: Fury Road won the Screen Actors Guild Award for Outstanding Performance by a Stunt Ensemble in a Motion Picture, and was also nominated at the 68th Directors Guild of America Awards, and 27th Producers Guild of America Awards. The American Film Institute included the film in their list of the top ten of the year.

Accolades

Notes

References

External links
 

Mad Max: Fury Road